Ngosa Sunzu (born 19 July 1998) is a Zambian footballer who currently plays as a midfielder for Czech side FK Teplice.

Club career
Sunzu joined Czech top flight team Teplice in November 2021. He went on to make his debut a month later, after overcoming a muscle strain.

Personal life
Ngosa is the younger brother of fellow Zambian international footballer Stoppila Sunzu.

Career statistics

Club

Notes

International

References

1998 births
Living people
Zambian footballers
Zambia youth international footballers
Zambia international footballers
Association football midfielders
Liga Leumit players
Czech First League players
Bohemian Football League players
NAPSA Stars F.C. players
Hapoel Ra'anana A.F.C. players
Beitar Tel Aviv Bat Yam F.C. players
FK Teplice players
Zambian expatriate footballers
Zambian expatriate sportspeople in Israel
Expatriate footballers in Israel
Expatriate footballers in the Czech Republic